IBC Vehicles Limited is an English automotive manufacturing company based in Luton, Bedfordshire and since 2021 a wholly owned subsidiary of the multinational corporation Stellantis. Its principal operation is an assembly plant located in Luton, Vauxhall Luton, which currently produces light commercial vehicles sold under the Citroën, Opel, Peugeot and Vauxhall marques.

History
IBC Vehicles has its roots in Bedford Vehicles, the truck and bus manufacturing subsidiary of Vauxhall.

In 1986 the Bedford Vehicles van factory in Luton was reorganised as a joint venture with Isuzu.  The resulting company was named IBC Vehicles (Isuzu Bedford Company Limited). Its first product was the Bedford Midi - a badge engineered clone of the Isuzu Fargo midsize panel van, intended to replace the ageing Bedford CF. The Suzuki-based Bedford Rascal microvan followed in 1987. In 1992 the factory produced a European version of the Isuzu MU aka Amigo 4WD called the Opel/Vauxhall Frontera Sport and the Isuzu MU Wizard aka Rodeo 4WD called the Opel/Vauxhall Frontera and a range of Renault-designed vans sold under the Vauxhall and Opel brand names. The Bedford name was dropped completely as were all of its preceding range apart from the Midi. The Frontera A was produced from 1992 to 1998 and the Frontera B 1998 - 2004.

In 1998 GM bought Isuzu out of the IBC partnership and renamed the plant to GMM Luton (GM Manufacturing Luton).

General Motors sold Opel, including Vauxhall and the Luton plant, to Groupe PSA in 2017.  Groupe PSA merged with Fiat Chrysler Automobiles to form Stellantis in January 2021.

Products
GMM Luton produced the Opel/Vauxhall Vivaro A, Renault Trafic and Nissan Primastar from 2001 to 2014.  The Hi-top roof versions were built in Barcelona, Spain by Renault at the former Nissan Plant because the Luton IBC building was not high enough to accommodate the Hi-top vehicles. By 2011, the plant had produced 1.25 million vehicles since the 2001 launch, with production now down to 68,000 vehicles a year, with a capacity for 100,000.

Opel/Vauxhall announced in 2011 that the 2013 Vivaro would continue production at Luton and the high roof versions and the Renault Trafic would be manufactured at Sandouville, France.

In early 2020, in addition to the Vauxhall Vivaro, the plant started building Citroën Dispatch and Peugeot Expert vans. In September 2022, the factory began to produce the Fiat Scudo.

References

External links
Luton Plant. Facts and Figures 

Companies of England
Manufacturing companies established in 1986
Companies based in Luton
Motor vehicle assembly plants in the United Kingdom
Opel factories
Vauxhall Motors